Leptospermum subglabratum is a species of open shrub that is endemic to a south-eastern New South Wales. It has thin, rough bark, egg-shaped to lance-shaped leaves with the narrower end towards the base, white flowers arranged singly on short side shoots and relatively small fruit that falls from the plant at maturity.

Description
Flowering mainly occurs from December to January and the fruit is a capsule  in diameter with the remains of the sepals attached. The fruit falls from the plant at maturity.

Taxonomy
Leptospermum subglabratum was first formally described in 1989 by Joy Thompson in the journal Telopea, based on plant material collected by Barbara Briggs near Shrouded Gods Mountains in the Budawangs.

Distribution and habitat
This teatree is restricted to a small area of south-east New South Wales, mainly in the Budawangs, where it grow on the edge of sandstone cliffs.

References

 subglabratum
Myrtales of Australia
Flora of New South Wales
Plants described in 1989
Taxa named by Joy Thompson